The Fly Castelluccio Mach is a family of Italian paramotors that was designed and produced by Fly Castelluccio of Ascoli Piceno for powered paragliding. Now out of production, when it was available the aircraft were supplied complete and ready-to-fly.

Design and development
The Mach was designed to comply with the US FAR 103 Ultralight Vehicles rules as well as European regulations. It features a paraglider-style wing, single-place accommodation and a single  Solo 210 engine in pusher configuration powering a two-bladed or four-bladed wooden propeller through a reduction drive.

As is the case with all paramotors, take-off and landing is accomplished by foot. Inflight steering is accomplished via handles that actuate the canopy brakes, creating roll and yaw.

Variants
Mach 1 Light
Model with a  Solo 210 engine in pusher configuration with a reduction drive and a  diameter two-bladed wooden propeller.
Mach 2
Model with a  Solo 210 engine in pusher configuration with a reduction drive and a  diameter two-bladed wooden propeller.
Mach 2 4BL
Model with a  Solo 210 engine in pusher configuration with a reduction drive and a  diameter four-bladed wooden propeller.
Mach 3
Model with a  Solo 210 engine in pusher configuration with a reduction drive and a  diameter two-bladed wooden propeller.
Mach 3 4BL
Model with a  Solo 210 engine in pusher configuration with a reduction drive and a  diameter four-bladed wooden propeller.
Mach 4
Model with a  Solo 210 engine in pusher configuration with a reduction drive and a  diameter two-bladed wooden propeller.
Mach 4C
Model optimized for endurance competition flying, with a  Solo 210 EVO engine in pusher configuration with a reduction drive and a  diameter two-bladed wooden propeller.

Specifications (Mach 1)

References

External links
 archive

Mach
2000s Italian ultralight aircraft
Single-engined pusher aircraft
Paramotors